Radack is a surname and the name of an island in the Marshall Islands. Notable people with the surname include:

Daniel Radack (fl. 2014), American engineer
Jesselyn Radack (born 1970), American attorney

See also
Radach